Berman is a surname that may be derived from the German and  Yiddish phrase  ( ‘bear-man’) or from the Dutch , meaning the same. Notable people with the surname include:

 Abba Berman (1919–2005), Polish-Israeli Rosh Yeshiva
 Adolf Berman (1906–1978), Polish-Israeli activist and politician
 Ahmet Berman (1932–1980), Turkish football player
Alan Berman (born 1943), American psychologist, psychotherapist, and suicidologist
 Alexander Johan Berman (1828–1886), Dutch minister and literary critic
 Amy Berman (born 1954), circuit judge
 Antoine Berman (1942–1991), French translator and theorist of translation
 Arthur L. Berman (1935–2020), American lawyer and former Illinois state Representative
 Bart Berman (born 1938), Dutch-Israeli pianist
 Bob Berman, American astronomer
 Boris Berman (musician) (born 1948), Russian-Israeli-American pianist
 Boris Berman (journalist) (born 1948), Soviet and Russian journalist and broadcaster
 Boris Berman (chekist) (1901–1939), Worker of the USSR State Security officials, Commissioner of Public Security the third rank
 Brian Berman, American family physician
 Bruce Berman (born 1952), American film producer
 Chris Berman (born 1955), American sportscaster
 David Berman (musician) (1967–2019), American poet and vocalist
 David Berman (graphic designer), Canadian graphic designer
 David Berman (mobster) (1903–1957), American mobster
Debbie Berman, South African film and television editor
 Dianne Goldman Berman Feinstein (born 1933), American politician
 Eugène Berman (1899–1972), Russian painter
 Franklin Berman (born 1939), British barrister, judge, and arbitrator
 Gail Berman (born 1956), American manager in the movie industry
 Geoffrey Berman (born 1959), a United States Attorney 
 Harold J. Berman (1918–2007), American professor of law
 Harris Berman (c.1938–2021), American physician
 Helen Berman (born 1936), Dutch-Israeli painter
 Helen M. Berman (born 1943), American chemistry professor
 Henry Berman (1914–1979), American film editor 
 Howard Berman (born 1941), American politician
 Ilan Berman (born 1975), Vice President of the American Foreign Policy Council
 Iosif Berman (1892–1941), Romanian photographer, and journalist
 Jakov Berman (1868–1933), Russian philosopher
 Jakub Berman (1901–1984), Communist politician in Poland
 Jekuthiel Berman (1825–), Russian Hebrew novelist
 Jennifer Berman, American sexual health expert, urologist, and female sexual medicine specialist
 John Berman (born 1972), American news anchor
 Joost Berman (1793–1855), Dutch judge and poet
 Josh Berman, American writer and producer for television
 Joshua Berman, Professor of Bible at Bar-Ilan University
 Jules Berman (1911–1998), American businessperson
 Julie Berman (born 1983), American actress
 Julius Berman, American lawyer and rabbi
 Karel Berman (1919–1995), Czech vocalist and composer
 Karen Berman, American psychiatrist and physician-scientist 
Karl Berman (senior) (1811–1885), German clarinetist and basset horn player
 Laura Berman, American sex therapist and educator
 Lazar Berman (1930–2005), Russian pianist
 Leah Berman (born 1976), American mathematician
 Len Berman (born 1947), American sportscaster, journalist, news anchor and author
 Leo Berman (1935–2015), Texas state Representative
 Léonide Berman (1896–1976), Russian painter
 Lori Berman, former Florida state Representative
 Lyle Berman (born 1941), American poker player
 Marshall Berman (1940–2013), American philosopher and writer
 Matvei Berman (1898–1939), Russian, Head of the GULAG 1932–1937
 Maxine Berman (1946–2018), American educator and Michigan state Representative
Mitchell Berman, American Professor of Law at the University of Pennsylvania Law School
 Monty Berman (1913–2006), British cinematographer and film and television producer
 Morris Berman (born 1944), American historian
 Nathaniel Berman, American historian
 Nechemia Berman, Chief Rabbi of Uruguay
 Otto Berman (1891–1935), American accountant
 Pandro S. Berman (1905–1996), American film producer 
 Paul Berman (born 1949), American writer
 Pavel Berman (born 1970), violinist and conductor
 Rick Berman (born 1945), American television producer
 Richard Berman (born 1942), American corporate lobbyist
 Richard M. Berman (born 1943), American federal judge
 Rodney Berman (born 1969), Welsh local government politician
 Ruth A. Berman, Israeli linguist, Professor Emerita, Tel Aviv University
 Ryan Berman, Michigan state Representative
 Sabina Berman (born 1955), Mexican writer and journalist
 Sanford Berman (born 1933), American librarian
 Saul Berman (born 1939), American Orthodox rabbi and educator
 Serena Berman (born 1990), American actress
 Shanik Berman (born 1965), Mexican journalist and entertainer
 Shelley Berman (1925–2017), American entertainer
Sheri Berman (BA 1987), American political scientist
 Simon Berman (1861–1934), Dutch mayor
 Steve Berman, American writer
 Tal Berman (born 1973), Israeli TV host and Radio broadcaster
 Thijs Berman (born 1957), Dutch politician
 Wallace Berman (1926–1976), American artist
 Yitzhak Berman (1913–2013), Israeli politician

See also
 Berman and Company, Washington DC-based public affairs firm
 Berman v. Parker
 Robinson, Silverman, Pearce, Aronsohn, and Berman, New York-based law firm
 Neuberger Berman, New York-based investment management firm
 Beerman
 Behrmann
 Behrman
 Bearman
 Biermann
 Noah Baerman (1974–), American jazz pianist
 Carl Baermann (1810–1885), German clarinetist and composer, son of Heinrich Baermann
 Heinrich Baermann (1784–1847), German musician
 Gottfried Bermann (1897–1995), German publisher, known as Gottfried Fischer

References

Jewish surnames
Yiddish-language surnames